is the debut solo single by Rino Sashihara, released in Japan on May 2, 2012.

Background 
The single was released in four versions: Type-A, Type-B, Type-C, and Type-D.

"Soredemo Suki Da yo" was released on the same day with Nogizaka46's "Oide Shampoo". The 2 singles clashed in the charts. On the first day, Nogizaka46 sold 111,000 copies vs. Sashihara's 57,000 (rounded to the nearest thousand). On the second day, Rino Sashihara took the first spot and didn't let go of it for the rest of the week. Despite that, Sashihara lost; the first position in the weekly chart belonged to Nogizaka46, which sold 156,000 singles against the second place's 124,000.

Track listing

Type-A

Type-B

Type-C

Type-D 
Mu-mo shop limited edition.

Charts

References

External links 
 Riho Sashihara discography

2012 singles
Billboard Japan Hot 100 number-one singles
Songs with lyrics by Yasushi Akimoto
Songs written by Tsunku
Rino Sashihara songs
Avex Trax singles
2012 songs